Soul Society may refer to:
Soul Society, a fictional location in the Bleach anime and manga
Soul Society, a song in the album The Black Halo by metal band Kamelot
Society of Soul, a member of the group of bands Dungeon Family